Paul Nahman Shulman (1922 – 16 May 1994), also known by his Hebrew name, Shaul Ben-Tzvi, was the second commander of the Israeli Navy.

Biography
Born in 1922 in Connecticut and raised in New York, Shulman graduated from the United States Naval Academy at Annapolis graduating, early, because of wartime in 1944, with the class of 1945. During World War II, he fought in the Pacific theater and was discharged from the US Navy in 1945 after the surrender of Japan. Shulman was very affected by the Holocaust, and decided to help smuggle Jews from post-Holocaust Europe into Mandate Palestine. In 1948, Shulman emigrated to Israel.

In November that year, he was asked by Prime Minister David Ben-Gurion to help establish an Israeli Navy. During the 1948 Arab-Israeli War, he commanded a blockade of the Gaza Strip and the capture of Ein Gedi on the Dead Sea. In 1949, he became the second commander of the Navy, after Gershon Zak decided to return to a career in education. However, he retired from the Navy in 1949, becoming an advisor to Ben-Gurion on naval issues.

In 1994, he died in his home in Haifa at the age of 72.

References

1922 births
1994 deaths
People from Connecticut
People from Haifa
Jewish American military personnel
United States Naval Academy alumni
United States Navy personnel of World War II
American emigrants to Israel
20th-century Israeli Jews
Israeli Navy generals
20th-century American Jews